State Route 224 (SR 224) is a  state highway in the central part of the U.S. state of Georgia. It runs southwest-to-northeast in an arc through portions of Macon and Houston counties.

Route description
SR 224 begins at an intersection with SR 26 (Spaulding Road) just east of Montezuma. Just before entering Perry, it meets SR 127 (Marshallville Road). SR 127 begins a concurrency into town. In Perry, the two routes intersect US 41/SR 7, which join the concurrency. Immediately after that intersection is an interchange with Interstate 75 (I-75). Shortly after, SR 224 departs to the southeast, while US 41/SR 7/SR 127 head to the northeast into downtown Perry on General Courtney Hodges Boulevard. The highway heads southeast through rural areas until it meets its eastern terminus, an intersection with US 341/SR 11 (Main Street) southeast of Perry.

SR 224 is not part of the National Highway System, a system of roadways important to the nation's economy, defense, and mobility.

Major intersections

See also

References

External links

 Georgia Roads (Routes 221 - 240)

224
Transportation in Macon County, Georgia
Transportation in Houston County, Georgia